The Ukrainian Manual Alphabet is used for fingerspelling in Ukrainian Sign Language.

External links
Ukrainian Manual Alphabet photos

Manual alphabet